William of Salicet (1210–1277) (Italian: Guglielmo da Saliceto; French: Guillaume de Salicet; Latin: Guilielmus de Salicetum) was an Italian surgeon and cleric in Saliceto.

He broke tradition with Galen by claiming that pus formation was bad for wounds and for the patient. He was a professor at the University of Bologna. In 1275 he wrote Chirurgia which promoted the use of a surgical knife over cauterizing. He also was the author of Summa conservationis et curationis on hygiene and therapy. Lanfranc of Milan was a pupil who brought William's methods into France.  William gave lectures on the importance of regular bathing for infants, and special care for the hygiene of pregnant women.

References 

The Surgery of William of Saliceto, English translation by Leonard D. Rosenman .
Copernicus, Ivan Crowe .
Medicine and the Italian Universities: 1250-1600, Nancy G. Siraisi.

External links

 Of blood, inflammation and gunshot wounds: the history of the control of sepsis, AJ Thurston.

1210 births
1277 deaths
Italian anatomists
13th-century Italian Roman Catholic priests
Medieval surgeons
People from the Province of Cuneo
13th-century Italian physicians
13th-century Italian writers
13th-century Latin writers
Academic staff of the University of Bologna